Australian airExpress was a logistics company based in Melbourne, Australia. It operated freight-only services within Australia using aircraft operated by Express Freighters Australia (a subsidiary of Qantas), National Jet Systems and Pel-Air; and a fleet of land vehicles. Its main base was Melbourne Airport. Australian airExpress was absorbed into Qantas Freight during February 2013.

History

 

Australian airExpress was established in early 1992 as a domestic air freight company with the ability of pick-up and delivery services using both vans and trucks. AaE started operations on 1 August 1992. It was established as a joint venture between Australia's largest airline Qantas (50%), and government-owned postal provider Australia Post (50%) as a main competitor to the then Ansett Australia. AaE operated more than 50 nightly inter-capital freighter services. AaE used freight capacity on Qantas domestic flights and also dedicated cargo services operated on its behalf by several different companies, principally using Boeing 727 aircraft. Australian airExpress began the phasing out of the 727s in September 2006 and they were replaced by specially converted Boeing 737 aircraft that were formerly part of the Qantas fleet, operated by Qantas subsidiary Express Freighters Australia. The first Boeing 737 entered service on 24 October 2006. On 2 October 2012, Qantas announced it would acquire Australia Post's 50% interest in AaE, in return for Australia Post acquiring Qantas' 50% interest in Star Track Express.

Australian airExpress was absorbed into Qantas Freight during February 2013. As a result, its own website ceased to exist but some of its operations are still continuing as the air division of Star Track Express.

Operations
AaE flight operations were somewhat complex and varied. "Next Flight" services used space on the next available scheduled Qantas passenger flights. Items carried for Overnight, 2 Day Economy and Off-Peak deliveries were flown on both Qantas and Australian airExpress aircraft operated by Express Freighters Australia, National Jet Systems subsidiary National Jet Express, and Pel-Air. The company did not service the Northern Territory 'overnight' from Sydney. Due to the three different service providers, AaE flights operated using different flight numbers and callsigns. The Express Freighters Australia Boeing 737s used Qantas flight numbers and callsigns as the ground handling was done by Qantas/Express Freighters, while National Jet Express used the aircraft registration as their callsign and used the IATA designator XM for its flight numbers (and used the ICAO designator XME). Pel-Air flights also used XM  flight numbers but had no specific callsigns. AaE also had an international Division called Australian airExpress International.

Destinations
In February 2008 Australian airExpress operated freight services to the following domestic scheduled destinations:

Australian Capital Territory
 Canberra Airport

New South Wales
 Newcastle Airport
 Sydney Airport

Northern Territory
 Ayers Rock Airport
 Darwin International Airport
 Gove Airport

Queensland
 Brisbane Airport
 Cairns Airport
 Gold Coast Airport
 Mackay Airport
 Rockhampton Airport
 Townsville Airport

South Australia
 Adelaide Airport

Tasmania
 Hobart Airport
 Launceston Airport

Victoria
 Melbourne Airport Main Hub

Western Australia
 Perth Airport

Fleet
The following aircraft were operating on behalf of Australian airExpress in December 2011:

See also
 Qantas
 Australia Post
 Cargo airlines
 List of defunct airlines of Australia
 Aviation in Australia

References

External links

Australian airExpress
Qantas
Australia Post

Airlines established in 1992
Airlines disestablished in 2013
Qantas
Cargo airlines of Australia
Australian companies established in 1992
Australian companies disestablished in 2013
Defunct airlines of Australia
Companies based in Melbourne